Operation Motel was a Zimbabwe Rhodesian military operation in Zambia with clandestine assistance from the South African Air Force (SAAF) during the Rhodesian Bush War. The Rhodesian Air Force planned raids against a ZIPRA camp in Northern Zambia.

Operation
The operation consisted of two raids on a ZIPRA camp on 23 August 1979. The Rhodesian and South African Canberra bombers  and Hawker Hunter strike aircraft took off at 09h40 for Operation Motel I with the aircraft forming over Victoria Falls before conducting a low-level bombing attack on a camp 32 km south of Solwezi in Northern Zambia.

Aftermath
See also: Operation Motel II

The same formation left again for Operation Motel II at 15h30 for another attack on the same target and the aircraft returned to base with one of the SAAF Canberra bombers was damaged by friendly fire after taking shrapnel from bomb explosions.

References

Further reading
 
 

Conflicts in 1979
Battles and operations of the Rhodesian Bush War
Military operations of the Rhodesian Bush War involving South Africa
1979 in Zambia
1979 in Rhodesia
1979 in South Africa
August 1979 events in Africa
Rhodesia–Zambia relations